Tsuru River or Tsuru-kawa River (鶴川 in Japanese) is a branch of the Sagami River of Honshu, Japan. It runs 26.3 kilometers in Yamanashi prefecture.

Geography 
Tsuru River originates in conifer wood of the Kosuge village where is located near Tsuru Pass but soon crosses the border with the  Uenohara municipality area. It follows generally southeast and southly course to exit into the Sagami River at the Uenohara town.

Except for the area around the river mouth, or one of the river terraces of the Sagami, the Tsuru runs narrow valley between mountains. Nagasaku (長作), Saihara (西原), Yuzurihara (棡原) and another small villages scatter along it. An asphalt paved road, Yamanashi Prefectural Highway 33rd: Uenohara - Tabayama Line, links them to Uenohara town.

Biodiversity is well preserved due to mountain wood and the lack of dam development. Many species of upper stream fish in Japan live; White-spotted Char (Salvelinus leucomaenis), Seema (Oncorhynchus masou), Japanese Fluvial Sculpin (Cottus pollux), Ayu (Plecoglossus altivelis), Amur Minnow (Rhynchocypris lagowskii), Pale Chub (Zacco platypus) and others. Also Forest Green Tree Frog (Rhacophorus arboreus) and Japanese clawed salamander (Onychodactylus japonicus) inhabit this river.

Good water quality allow culture of wasabi.

Administration 
Truru River belongs to the Sagami river system, one of the first class river system under the Japanese River Law. The principal of the law says the control and the maintenance of the river to the national government. But in reality all part of the Tsuru is entrusted to the Yamanashi prefecture.

References 

Rivers of Yamanashi Prefecture
Rivers of Japan